"Time Stands Still" is a song by American rock band The All-American Rejects, released as the third and final single from their self-titled debut studio album on July 14, 2003.

Background and composition
“Time Stands Still” was written by Nick Wheeler and Tyson Ritter. "It's about a chick, pretty much," Ritter explained, "It's pretty much about my ex-girlfriend and the ins and outs of the relationship. It's about me wishing that nothing would change from that honeymoon period, the first six or seven months," he said before adding, "For me, it's like three!”

"It's that time when nothing matters with your lady because it's all good," Ritter continued. "And nothing gets you down, nothing at all." Wheeler later said the composition of the song is "About 96-beats-per-minute and it's in the key of C major."

Reception

Critical reception
The song received mixed reviews from music critics. MTV compared the track to the band's previous singles "Swing, Swing" and "The Last Song", saying it "focused more on the good times, before the bad ones arose". Sputnikmusic commented saying "[The acoustic guitar] disrupts the mood of the chorus and ultimately, the entire song. The bridge is a bit of a minor key and is pretty catchy which saves some of the song. The piano outro is decent, but it doesn't fit with the rest of the song and therefore sounds bad."

Chart performance
Despite promotion, the song failed to chart in any territory.

Music video
The music video for "Time Stands Still" was directed by Meiert Avis and shot in early August 2003 in Los Angeles and was released later that month. It revolves around lead vocalist and bassist of the band Tyson Ritter arriving for band rehearsals via Jeep at a warehouse where the other members are already practicing and performing the song.

The video also sees Ritter arrive at the warehouse at different points in time several times where his surroundings reverse back in time while he goes forward and seeing another version of himself rehearsing before merging into [that] version of him. Towards the end of the video, Ritter unmerges from himself as times goes backwards for him and his surroundings proceed forward, before ending back at the start of the video.

Track listing

Release history

References

2003 singles
The All-American Rejects songs
Music videos directed by Meiert Avis
2002 songs
DreamWorks Records singles
Polydor Records singles
Songs written by Nick Wheeler
Songs written by Tyson Ritter